Isn't It Romantic: The Standards Album is an album by the American pop singer Johnny Mathis that was released on February 1, 2005, by Columbia Records. In an interview that year with NPR's Ed Gordon, the singer describes a conversation he had with record company executives: "They said, 'We want you to sing the most popular songs from the American musical theater that you haven't sung in the past.'... I sat down and finally came up with a list of nine songs that I hadn't recorded that were very familiar to the public."

The tenth song on the album, "Over the Rainbow", is a duet with Ray Charles that originally appeared on the late musician's final release, Genius Loves Company, in 2004 and won the Grammy Award for Best Instrumental Arrangement Accompanying Vocalist(s) for its arranger Victor Vanacore. Mathis received a Grammy nomination for this album in the category of Best Traditional Pop Vocal Album.

Reception
John Bush of AllMusic noted that "singers from a variety of genres had jumped on the standards bandwagon" around this time due in large part to the success that Rod Stewart was having with his series of Great American Songbook albums. "There are a few qualities, however, that separate [Mathis] from the competition. His long mastery of singing love songs is one, and his comprehensive knowledge of the pop canon is another (the last would be, of course, that wonderful voice)." He also wrote, "His choices for the material on Isn't It Romantic are excellent, all of them natural fits for both his voice and his persona."

Christopher Loudon of Jazz Times remarked that Mathis's latest "arrives about six months prior to his 70th birthday and coincides with his career's 50th anniversary. By the time Sinatra started hitting those sorts of touchstones, his vocal magnificence had been reduced to stubble. Not so Mathis. Throughout the 10 tracks assembled here... the once and future makeout king sounds heavenly as ever."

Track listing
 "Isn't It Romantic?" (Lorenz Hart, Richard Rodgers) – 3:45
 "Love Is Here to Stay" (George Gershwin, Ira Gershwin) – 4:41
 "Day by Day" (Sammy Cahn, Axel Stordahl, Paul Weston) – 2:41
 "Dindi" (Ray Gilbert, Antonio Carlos Jobim, Aloysio de Oliveira) – 4:10
 "There's a Kind of Hush" (Les Reed, Geoff Stephens) – 4:13
 "This Can't Be Love" (Lorenz Hart, Richard Rodgers) – 2:53
 "Cottage for Sale" (Larry Conley, Willard Robison) – 5:15
 "Almost Like Being in Love" (Alan Jay Lerner, Frederick Loewe) – 3:39
 "The Rainbow Connection" (Kenny Ascher, Paul Williams) – 3:41
 "Over the Rainbow"  performed with Ray Charles  (Harold Arlen, E.Y. Harburg) – 4:52

Personnel
From the liner notes for the original album:

Performers
Johnny Mathis – vocals
Mike Lang – piano (except as noted)
Jorge Calandrelli – piano ("Dindi")
Dave Carpenter – bass
Charles Berghofer – bass
Gregg Field – drums
Luis Conte – Latin percussion
Ramón Stagnaro – guitar
Bruce Dukov – concertmaster
Robin Olsen – violin
Julie Gigante – violin
Michael Markman – violin
Patricia Johnson – violin
Natalie Leggett – violin
Guillermo Romero – violin
Darius Campo – violin
Berj Garabedian – violin
Jacqueline Brand – violin
Eun-Mee Ahn – violin
Lily H. Chen – violin
Phillip Levy – violin
Tamara Hatwan – violin
Horia Moroaica – violin
Katia Popov – viola
Roland Kato – viola
Victoria Miskolczy – viola
Raymond Tisher – viola
Harry Shirinian – viola
Samuel Formicola – viola
Stephen Erdody – cello
Tim Landauer – cello
Armen Ksajikian – cello
Christine Soule – cello
Gayle Levant – harp
Joe Stone – oboe
Warren Luening – trumpet
Greg Huckins – baritone saxophone
Tom Scott – alto/tenor saxophone (solos)
Chauncey Welsch – trombone
Gary Foster – tenor saxophone
John Reynolds – French horn
Brian O'Connor – French horn
Paul Klintworth – French horn

Production
Jorge Calandrelli – producer (except as noted), arranger, conductor
John Burk – producer ("Over the Rainbow")
Terry Howard – producer ("Over the Rainbow")
Herbert Waltl – producer ("Over the Rainbow")
Jay Landers – executive producer
Edward Blau – executive producer
Don Murray – recording engineer; mixing engineer (except as noted)
Al Schmitt – mixing engineer ("Over the Rainbow")
Gregg Field – additional engineering
Marco Marinangeli – additional engineering
Seth Presant – additional engineering
Vlado Meller – mastering 
Joe Soldo – musicians contractor
JoAnne Kane – copying service
Mark Graham – copying service
Nancy Donald – art direction
William Claxton – photography
Mastered at Sony Music Studios, New York, New York

References

2005 albums
Johnny Mathis albums
Columbia Records albums
Covers albums